Live Oak, California may refer to:
Live Oak, Sacramento County, California, a place in California
Live Oak, Santa Cruz County, California
Live Oak, Sutter County, California
 Quercus agrifolia, California Live Oak tree

nl:Live Oak (Californië)